The Pukenui Solar Farm is a photovoltaic power station under construction at Pukenui, near Houhora on the Aupouri Peninsula in the Far North District of New Zealand. The farm will be owned by Far North Solar Farm. When complete the farm will cover 12 hectares and generate 16 MW of electricity. It is expected to be the largest solar farm in the country when complete.

Far North Solar Farm applied for resource consent for the project in February 2021. Construction began on 1 July 2021, with Prime Minister Jacinda Ardern turning the first sod. It was expected to be operational in the second half of 2022, but as of October 2022 the site was untouched.

See also

 Solar power in New Zealand

References

Solar power in New Zealand
Proposed renewable energy power stations in New Zealand
Far North District